Alex Bailey (born 21 September 1983) is a professional footballer.
A right-back, Bailey began as an Arsenal trainee, winning the FA Youth Cup in 2001, but was released by the Gunners and signed by Chesterfield prior to the start of the 2004–05 season. He remained at Saltergate for three years scoring one goal before moving on to Halifax Town and then St Albans City before being released at the end of the 2009/10 season after only making 15 appearances

Early career
Bailey attended St Bonaventure's RC School from age 11 to 14. Alex played for the scholar football team and captained while he attended St Bons. Alex attended St Bonaventures alongside other notable footballers such as Jermain Defoe of Tottenham Hotspur and Clayton Fortune, who formally played for Aldershot Town. Alex was spotted and subsequently taken in as an Arsenal trainee thereafter.

Honours
Arsenal
FA Youth Cup: 2000–01

References

External links

1983 births
Living people
English Football League players
National League (English football) players
Association football fullbacks
English footballers
Arsenal F.C. players
Chesterfield F.C. players
Halifax Town A.F.C. players
St Albans City F.C. players
Footballers from the London Borough of Newham
People educated at St Bonaventure's Catholic School